New Avon is a Canadian unincorporated community in Northfield Parish, Sunbury County, New Brunswick.

Location 
It is located 3 kilometres southwest of Minto.

History

Notable people

See also
List of communities in New Brunswick

References

Communities in Sunbury County, New Brunswick